Wildbach may refer to:
Wildbach (TV series), a German television series
Wildbach (Wurm), a river of North Rhine-Westphalia, Germany, tributary of the Wurm
Wildbach (Main), a river of Baden-Württemberg, Germany, tributary of the Main